Fritz Köster (2 February 1855 – 1934) was a German anarchist editor and trade unionist.

Born in Rodenberg, Hesse (now in Lower Saxony), Köster was active in the Social Democratic Party of Germany (SPD) starting in the early 1880s. He moved to Groß Ottersleben, near Magdeburg, where he participated in the socialist movement, which was illegal at the time because of the Anti-Socialist Laws, and was a leader in the trade union of the town. For these activities he was sentenced to prison multiple times, most notably in 1886 for three months for libel, and in 1887 for eighteen months for the dissemination of illegal literature. After the sunset of the Anti-Socialist Laws in 1890, he was part of the left-wing opposition known as Die Jungen in the SPD, as the delegate of Wanzleben at the party convention. In the same year, he became editor of the Magdeburger Volkstimme. His articles for this newspaper led to several convictions, which he avoided by fleeing to Switzerland. In Zurich, he joined the Association of Independent Socialists founded by members of Die Jungen, who were expelled from the SPD. He was active in various unions and in the Swiss anarchist movement throughout the 1890s. Police reports call him the "leader of the Zurich anarchists". He returned to Groß Ottersleben in January 1910, after he could no longer be punished for his crimes because of the statute of limitations. Pressured by friends of his, Köster re-joined the SPD and Gustav Landauer and he tried to convince rural workers to join the anarchist movement. Soon, he led a farm workers' strike. In June 1910, he was going to be expelled from the SPD along with several other anarchists, but he left the party first. In 1911, he moved to Berlin, where he started working for the weekly newspaper Die Tribüne. In the same year he became the chief editor of Der Pionier, the theoretical organ of the syndicalist Free Association of German Trade Unions (FVdG), but in 1912, after having spent three months in various prisons, he quit this role and moved to Dresden. He then became a leader in the syndicalist construction workers' union in Dresden and travelled Germany as a lecturer. In 1920, he became a member of the Business Commission of the FVdG-follow-up organization, the Free Workers' Union of Germany (FAUD). He also contributed to Der Syndikalist, the organ of the FAUD, and Die Schöpfung.

Köster's wife Aimée contributed to the syndicalist women's magazine Die schaffende Frau and was a member of the Syndicalist Women's Federation (SFB).

References
Köster, Friedrich (Fritz). Magdeburger Biographisches Lexikon. University of Magdeburg. Retrieved September 6, 2007.

1855 births
1934 deaths
People from Schaumburg
German anarchists
Members of the Free Association of German Trade Unions
Members of the Free Workers' Union of Germany
People from the Electorate of Hesse
Anarcho-syndicalists